Kwon Song-hwa (born 5 February 1992) is a North Korean football forward who played for the North Korea women's national football team. She competed at the 2011 FIFA Women's World Cup. At the club level, she played for April 25.

International goals

Under-19

See also
 North Korea at the 2012 Summer Olympics

References

External links

1992 births
Living people
North Korean women's footballers
Place of birth missing (living people)
Women's association football forwards
North Korea women's international footballers
2011 FIFA Women's World Cup players